McCarry is a surname. Notable people with the surname include:

Aidan McCarry (born 1963), Irish hurler
Caleb McCarry, the Bush administration's Cuba Transition Coordinator
Charles McCarry (born 1930), American writer
Jane McCarry (born 1970), Scottish actress
Patrick McCarry  (1875 – 1921), Irish republican activist
Sean McCarry (born 1957)
Founder and regional commander of the Community Rescue Service (CRS) in Northern Ireland.